Vasil Vasilev (born 15 July 1976) is a Bulgarian former football goalkeeper.

Vasilev previously played for Rodopa Smolyan in the A PFG.

References

1976 births
Living people
Bulgarian footballers
PFC Belasitsa Petrich players
PFC Rodopa Smolyan players
FC Hebar Pazardzhik players
PFC Vidima-Rakovski Sevlievo players
FC Spartak Plovdiv players
PFC Marek Dupnitsa players
Akademik Sofia players
FC Malesh Mikrevo players
First Professional Football League (Bulgaria) players

Association football goalkeepers